Alex A. Knopp (born September 23, 1947) is an American professor and former politician who served three terms as a member of the Connecticut House of Representatives from the 139th District, which encompassed Norwalk, from 1987 to 1993. He served another four terms from the 137th District between 1993 to 2001 for the Democratic Party. 

From 2001 to 2005, Knopp served two-terms as mayor of Norwalk, Connecticut. He was defeated for re-election on November 8, 2005, by Republican Richard A. Moccia.

Early life and education 
Knopp is the son of Burton Knopp and Fay Honey Irving of Westport. Knopp received his B.A. from Wesleyan University in 1969, graduating Phi Beta Kappa and magna cum laude. He received his J.D. from George Washington University Law School in 1981, graduating as the valedictorian of his class.

Career 
Since 2008, Knopp has been serving as the executive director of the Center for Public Service and Social Justice at Yale University. Since 2006, he has also been a visiting clinical lecturer at Yale Law School.

Politics 
Prior to serving as mayor, he served eight terms as a member of the Connecticut House of Representatives, first representing the 139th District for three terms from 1987 to 1993 and then due to redistricting, representing the 137th District for four more terms from 1993 to 2001.

He served two terms as Norwalk Councilman-at-Large from 1983 to 1987.

Personal life 
On March 25, 1984, Knopp married Bette L. Bono (b. 1950), in Norwalk, Connecticut. They have two children.

References

1940s births
George Washington University Law School alumni
Living people
Mayors of Norwalk, Connecticut
Democratic Party members of the Connecticut House of Representatives
People from Westport, Connecticut
Wesleyan University alumni